Turobin  is a village in Biłgoraj County, Lublin Voivodeship, in eastern Poland. It is the seat of the gmina (administrative district) called Gmina Turobin.

When the Nazis invaded Poland in 1939, more than 1,400 Jews lived in Turobin. Jews from the nearby town of Wysokie and from other locations in Poland such as Lublin, Łódź, Koło, Konin and Słupsk were sent to the Turobin ghetto. In May, 1942, a group of 3,000 Jews from the Turobin ghetto was sent to Krasnystaw, from which they were dispatched to their deaths at Sobibór. On October 18, 1942, the remaining Jews were dispatched to Trawniki or Bełżec, where they met a certain death. A survivor of the Sobibór death camp, Josef Kopf, was murdered by one of his former Polish neighbors in 1944 when he returned to Turobin.

The village has a current population of 1,036.

References

Villages in Biłgoraj County
Lublin Governorate
Lublin Voivodeship (1919–1939)